Agents of S.H.I.E.L.D. is an ongoing digital comic book published by Marvel Comics. It debuted in 2016. It was created after the success of the television series of the same name. It is a sequel to the 2014 series S.H.I.E.L.D.

Publication history
The series has 10 issues and ended in February 2017. The series was written by Marc Guggenheim and drawn by German Peralta. It has had two collections as of January 2017, Agents of S.H.I.E.L.D.: The Coulson Protocols and Agents of S.H.I.E.L.D.: Under New Management.

Plot
The series focuses on Agent Coulson, Agent May, Fitz, Simmons, Skye/Daisy, Deathlok and Mockingbird.

Reception
The series holds an average rating of 6.2 by 21 professional critics according to review aggregation website Comic Book Roundup. Jennifer Cheng of Comic Book Resources stated that the first issue doesn’t add much yet to the franchise, but that it shows flashes of promise.

Prints

Issues

Collected editions

See also
 2016 in comics

References

External links
 Agents of S.H.I.E.L.D. at the Comic Book DB

S.H.I.E.L.D. titles
2016 comics debuts